MQ may  refer to:

Places 
 Martinique (ISO 3166-1 alpha-2 country code MQ)
 Vehicle registration code in Merseburg-Querfurt, Germany
 Midway Islands (FIPS PUB 10-4 territory code)
 Museumsquartier, a cultural area of Vienna, Austria

Technology 
 .mq, Internet country top-level domain code for Martinique
 Magic Quadrant, market research reports
 Metol and hydroquinone, a photographic developer
 Apache ActiveMQ, open source message queue
 Apache RocketMQ, open source messaging and streaming data platform
Message Queue, software-engineering component
 IBM MQ, IBM computer software

Weaponry 

MQ, an abbreviation used for naming American military drones
General Atomics MQ-1 Predator
General Atomics MQ-1C Gray Eagle
Northrop Grumman MQ-4C Triton
Northrop Grumman MQ-8 Fire Scout
Northrop Grumman MQ-8C Fire Scout
General Atomics MQ-9 Reaper
MTC MQ-17 SpyHawk
Boeing MQ-25 Stingray

Other uses 
MQ: Transforming Mental Health, a healthcare charity in the UK
 MQ, IATA airline designator for Envoy Air, formerly American Eagle Airlines
 MQ, formerly the IATA airline designator for Simmons Airlines, a predecessor of American Eagle Airlines